The Sonora Kid is a 1927 American silent Western film directed by Robert De Lacey and starring Tom Tyler, Peggy Montgomery and Billie Bennett.

Cast
 Tom Tyler as Tom MacReady 
 Peggy Montgomery as Phyllis Butterworth 
 Billie Bennett as Aunt Marie 
 Mark Hamilton as Chuck Saunders 
 Jack Richardson as Arthur Butterworth 
 Ethan Laidlaw as Tough Ryder 
 Bruce Gordon as James Poindexter 
 Barney Furey as Doc Knight 
 Victor Allen as Sheriff

References

Bibliography
 Munden, Kenneth White. The American Film Institute Catalog of Motion Pictures Produced in the United States, Part 1. University of California Press, 1997.

External links
 

1927 films
1927 Western (genre) films
Films directed by Robert De Lacey
American black-and-white films
Film Booking Offices of America films
Silent American Western (genre) films
1920s English-language films
1920s American films